Mineral Springs is an unincorporated community in Overton County, Tennessee, United States.

Notes

Unincorporated communities in Overton County, Tennessee
Unincorporated communities in Tennessee